Hintsa ka Khawuta (1780 – 12 May 1835), also known as Great or King Hintsa, was the king of the Xhosa Kingdom, founded by his great ancestor, King Tshawe. He ruled from 1820 until his death in 1835. The Xhosa Kingdom, at its peak, during his reign stretched from Mbhashe River, south of Mthatha to the Gamtoos River, (Xelexwa in isiXhosa) in the Southern Cape. 

Hintsa led one of the most powerful kingdoms (AmaXhosa) in the Southern Africa at the time, and would eventually come into war with the British Empire and colonial expansion in Southern Africa for a period of 100 years over the generations.

The Xhosa Kingdom is led by two houses, the Gcaleka House (Great House or the Senior House) which is the ruling house, and the Rharhabe House (right-hand house) which is the second senior house.

Tributary states during Hintsa's time were:

AbaThembu under King Ngubengcuka,
AmaMpondo under King Faku,
AmaBomvana clan under chief Gambushe,
AmaBhaca under King Madzikane and
AmaMpondomise under King Matiwane.

Although Xhosa by ethnicity, AmaMpondo, AbaThembu were autonomous tributary states to the Xhosa Kingdom. 

In his reign as king he had 11 sub-chieftaincies, and the Thembu, Mpondo, Bhaca kingdoms as tributaries.

Early life

Lineage and family
Hintsa was the son of Khawuta ka Gcaleka. His father was the eldest son of Gcaleka ka Phalo. His mother Nobutho is said to be a daughter of Tshatshu whose father was Xhoba and grandfather was Thukwa of Thembulan.

Hintsa is the 9th descendant of King Tshawe and is also a direct descendant of King Xhosa, the historical son of Mnguni who is known among the Ngunis as a skilled warrior but also aggressive.  

Hintsa had four known sons, Sarili ka Hintsa (1810) from his first wife Nomsa kaGambushe Tshezi and Ncaphayi ka Hintsa, Manxiwa ka Hintsa and Lindinyura ka Hintsa from an unknown second wife.

Reign

Hintsa became King in 1804, and he was crowned in 1820 after taking over from his uncle Nqoko ka Gcaleka who was regent king.

Hintsa is often compared to his great-ancestor, Tshawe kaNkosiyamntu.

Army and Military

The Xhosa Kingdom was one of the strongest kingdoms in Africa, and had arguably the largest army in the Southern Africa. Hintsa had a regiment called the 'Inkonyane' that moved company by company, on starting, it would be in the act of moving of moving off all day.

Some historians have argued that although the Hintsa had a large army, he may not be the greatest Xhosa king there ever was. However, Hintsa's chiefs who at times raided neighbouring kingdoms and attacked Xhosa rulers of tributary states had very powerful armies but were however no match to the Paramount Hintsa.

Invasions and civil war

During his reign, the Xhosa Kingdom was in conflict with the Cape Colony. The Xhosa nation was also under pressure from civil wars between chiefs and invasions by refugee tribes from the Mfecane.

The first invading group whom the Xhosas had to contend was what would become the 'AmaBhaca' led by Madzikane. After many vicissitudes, the Bhaca moved down into Thembuland where they attacked the Right Hand House amaTshatshu, causing them to flee to Maqoma for safety. The Xhosa, the Thembu and Mpondomise kingdoms combined forces and crushed the Bhaca, killing Madzikane (1823-5). The Bhaca entered into an uneasy alliance with the Mpondo and launched a joint attack on the Bomvana but this was repulsed by the Paramount, Hintsa.

Sixth Frontier war (1834–1836)

The Sixth Frontier War (1834–1836) between the Xhosa and the British is sometimes known as the Hintsa War. The war broke out when a Cape government commando party patrolled land near the Kat River which was occupied by Rharhabe chiefs Maqoma, Tyali and Botumane in December 1834. These patrols increased the bitterness that Maqoma and Tyali had after they had been forcibly removed by the Cape government from the Tyume Valley in 1833. On 21 December 1834, large force of some 10 000 RharhabeXhosas led by Maqoma, and Tyali swept into the Cape Colony, devastated the country between the Winterberg and the sea. Hintsa offered moral support to the chiefs but never sent an army to assist them.

After fighting for several months, the British troops led by Sir Harry Smith and Sir Benjamin d'Urban realised that their campaign had gone on for too long and would make them unpopular with authorities in Britain. To bolster their attack, they requested Hintsa to attack the Rharhabe chiefs. In early February 1835, Hintsa offered 1000 men but as weeks went on it became clear that Hintsa was not willing to betray the Rharhabe chiefs. d'Urban used this as an excuse to declare war on Hintsa. However, Hintsa opted to talk things through with the British.

On 14 April 1835 British governor Sir Benjamin d'Urban confronted King Hintsa with a large army. d'Urban insisted that Hintsa was the leader of the entire Xhosa nation and held him responsible for initial attacks on the Cape Colony, and for taking back cattle that was initially stolen from the Xhosa's. d'Urban dictated the following terms to Hintsa: That all the country from the Cape's prior frontier, the Keiskamma River, as far as the Great Kei River would be annexed as the British "Queen Adelaide Province", and its inhabitants declared British subjects, and all the cattle initially claimed from the Xhosa's to be returned to the Cape Colony.

An account of his death 

 

Invited to peace talks by the governor of the Cape, Harry Smith, the British demanded 50 000 cattle in compensation for the 1834 war, and that Hintsa order his chiefs to surrender. Hintsa was then held captive until the terms were met. 

Hintsa sent word to Maqoma, his military commander, warning him to prepare to defend the country.

In May 1835, Hintsa was riding as a prisoner guarded by a company of British soldiers led by Harry Smith. Mostert tells the story

Validity of the account 

The validity of the account of the death of Hintsa cannot be fully trusted. Some commentators have noted that British colonial officials were notorious for "recording" false accounts and would have likely portrayed Hintsa's death in a manner that cannot be attributed to a "hero's death". Details such as the king trying to flee, throwing his spear "harmlessy" and crying "mercy" are likely to have been added so as to diminish his status in history a bold military leader.

Legacy 

Hintsa is considered a hero in South Africa's and the Xhosa people's history. His wars, the Xhosa Kingdom and its subsequent demise layed foundation in the formation of South Africa as a country. Knowledge of his legacy is transmitted through oral history by poems and stories and he is often compared to his great-ancestor, Tshawe kaNkosiyamntu.

In 1996 Nicholas Tilana Gcaleka, a descendant of Hintsa, claimed to have returned the 161-year-old skull of Hintsa from Scotland. He also claimed that he was the great-great nephew of Hintsa and was called on by the spirits of his ancestors to go to Scotland to find Hintsa's head. The Gcaleka Xhosa monarch, Xolilizwe Sigcawu, and his court refused to sanction the planned burial of the skull because they said it was not the disembodied head of Hintsa.

The King Hintsa Bravery Award for leaders that live and act in the spirit of Hintsa kaKhawuta was established in 1999. It was awarded to Jacob Zuma in 2012. Earlier earners of the award include Robert Mugabe, president of Zimbabwe. The award is conferred by the ruling Xhosa king.

In 2014, Centane Technical College, Teko Technical College, H.B. Tsengwa Technical College and Idutywa Satellite formerly known as Idutywa Community College merged to form the King Hintsa Tvet College in honour of King Hintsa in 2013. The college's headquarters are in Butterworth, Eastern Cape. Every May, since 2013 the college has been hosting the King Hintsa Memorial Lecture.

References

1789 births
1835 deaths
Xhosa people
Rulers of the Gcaleka